Lawless Breed is a 1946 American Western film directed by Wallace Fox and written by Robert Creighton Williams. The film stars Kirby Grant, Fuzzy Knight, Poni Adams, Dick Curtis, Claudia Drake, Harry Brown, Charles King and Karl Hackett. The film was released on August 14, 1946, by Universal Pictures.

Plot

Cast        
Kirby Grant as Ted Everett
Fuzzy Knight as Tumbleweed
Poni Adams as Marjorie Bradley
Dick Curtis as Bartley Mellon / Captain Isaac Mellon
Claudia Drake as Cherie
Harry Brown as Stanford Witherspoon
Charles King as Tim Carson
Karl Hackett as Sheriff Dan Bradley
Hank Worden as The Deputy

References

External links
 

1946 films
American Western (genre) films
1946 Western (genre) films
Universal Pictures films
Films directed by Wallace Fox
American black-and-white films
1940s English-language films
1940s American films